Luohan Temple is a Buddhist temple located in Shifang, Sichuan, China. The temple is known as the "Buddhist Capital of Western Sichuan".

History
The original temple dates back to 709, during the region of Emperor Zhongzong of the Tang dynasty (618–907). At that time, Mazu Daoyi received ordination as a monk and studied in the temple.

Luohan Temple was badly damaged in wars in 1368. Three years later it was reconstructed. The temple was devastated by wars again in 1644, the year of the fall of the Ming dynasty (1368–1644). The modern temple was restored and redecorated by abbots Shi Nuan, Yuerong and Liting in the Qing dynasty (1644–1911).

On May 12, 2008, the Sichuan earthquake broke out, the Maternal and Child Care Service Centre of Shifang was moved to Luohan Temple, a total of 108 babies were born in the temple.

Architecture

Shanmen
Under the eaves is a plaque with the Chinese characters "Luohan Temple" written by Ji Yingxiong, the magistrate of Chengdu during the Kangxi period of the Qing dynasty.

Hall of Four Heavenly Kings
The statues of Maitreya Buddha, Skanda and Four Heavenly Kings are enshrined in the Hall of Four Heavenly Kings.

Mahavira Hall
The Mahavira Hall is the main hall in the temple. In the middle is Sakyamuni, statues of Ananda and Kassapa Buddha stand on the left and right sides of Sakyamuni's statue.

Arhat Hall
The Arhat Hall enshrining the 500 statues of Arhat.

Film
Luohan Temple was used for location filming of the 2018 drama film 108.

References

Buddhist temples in Sichuan
Buildings and structures in Deyang
Tourist attractions in Deyang
Chan temples